Andrew Muggleton (born 26 February 1974) is an English cricketer. He played one List A match for Surrey in 1995.

See also
 List of Surrey County Cricket Club players

References

External links
 

1974 births
Living people
English cricketers
Surrey cricketers
Sportspeople from Barnstaple